Nur Shams is a Palestinian refugee camp in the Tulkarm Governorate in the northwestern West Bank, located three kilometers east of Tulkarm. According to the Palestinian Central Bureau of Statistics, Nur Shams had a population of 6,479 inhabitants in 2007. 95.1% of the population of Nur Shams were refugees in 1997. The UNRWA-run healthcare facility for Nur Shams camp was re-built in 1996 with contributions from the Government of Germany.

Historian Benny Morris describes it as having been "a lonely and exclusively Arab area" in early 1936.

During the Mandate period, a British detention camp was situated at Nur Shams.

Nur Shams camp was established in 1952 on 226 dunums. The camp was transferred to Palestinian Authority control in November 1998, after the signing of the Wye River Memorandum and the first phase of further Israeli redeployment.

The two schools in the camp are in poor condition and are listed on UNRWA's priority list for replacement pending securing of funds to carry out the project. A four story Boys' school was constructed in 2004 and has 1035 pupils, the girls' school was constructed in 2001 and has 975 pupils.

See also
Palestinian refugee camps

References

External links
Welcome To Nur Shams R.C.

Populated places established in 1952
Palestinian refugee camps in the West Bank
Tulkarm Governorate
1952 establishments in Jordan